Rita the Mosquito is a 1966 Italian "musicarello" film directed by Lina Wertmüller (under the stage name George H. Brown). It has a sequel, Don't Sting the Mosquito.

Plot

Cast 

 Rita Pavone: Rita
 Giancarlo Giannini: Professor Paolo Randi
 Peppino De Filippo: Carmelo
 Nino Taranto: Director of education 
 Turi Ferro: Sicilian professor 
 Bice Valori: Luigina
 Laura Efrikian: Lili
 Tanya Lopert: Lida
 Vittorio Congia: Ciccio
 Giusi Raspani Dandolo: "Catherine Spaak"
 Paolo Panelli:  Peppino 
 Gino Bramieri:  Drunkard 
 Milena Vukotic:  	Dance instructor 
 Ugo Fangareggi:  Wolfgang
 Teddy Reno:  Himself  
 Silvia Dionisio: Collettina

References

External links

1966 films
1966 musical comedy films
Films directed by Lina Wertmüller
Musicarelli
1960s Italian-language films
1960s Italian films